Fontibus is a surname. Notable people with the surname include:

Galfridus de Fontibus, English hagiographer
Godefridus de Fontibus, scholastic philosopher and theologian
John de Fontibus (died 1225)
Robert de Fontibus, abbot of Inchcolm (1491-1492)